Jaffar Nazir (born August 16, 1977 in Muridke, Punjab) is a Pakistani first-class cricketer. A right-arm fast-medium bowler, Nazir made his debut in the 1997/98 season and has gone on to take over 500 first-class wickets.

External links
 

1977 births
Living people
Pakistani cricketers
Rawalpindi cricketers
Khan Research Laboratories cricketers
Sheikhupura cricketers
Sialkot cricketers
Quetta cricketers
Quetta Bears cricketers
Sialkot Stallions cricketers
People from Muridke